John Maurer Nelson (born June 8, 1948) is an American former competition swimmer, Olympic champion, and former world record-holder.

Nelson was born in Chicago, Illinois, and attended Pompano Beach High School in Pompano Beach, Florida.  He enrolled in Yale University, where he swam for coach Phil Moriarty's Yale Bulldogs swimming and diving team, which included other Olympic-caliber swimmers such as Don Schollander.

At the 1964 Olympic Games in Tokyo, Japan, Nelson received a silver medal for his second-place finish in the men's 1,500-meter freestyle.  Four years later, he competed at the 1968 Olympic Games in Mexico City, where he received a gold medal in the men's 4×200-meter freestyle relay beside his teammates Stephen Rerych, Mark Spitz and Schollander.  In individual competition, he received the bronze medal for his third-place finish in the men's 200-meter freestyle.

Nelson improved the world record on the 400-meter freestyle (long course) on August 18, 1966 (4:11.8), only to be beaten by Schollander, his American teammate, on the same day (4:11.6).

See also
 List of Olympic medalists in swimming (men)
 List of Yale University people
 World record progression 400 metres freestyle

References

External links
 

1948 births
Living people
American male freestyle swimmers
World record setters in swimming
Olympic gold medalists for the United States in swimming
Nelson, John
Swimmers from Chicago
Swimmers at the 1964 Summer Olympics
Swimmers at the 1968 Summer Olympics
Yale Bulldogs men's swimmers
Medalists at the 1968 Summer Olympics
Medalists at the 1964 Summer Olympics
Olympic silver medalists for the United States in swimming
Olympic bronze medalists for the United States in swimming
Universiade medalists in swimming
Universiade gold medalists for the United States
Medalists at the 1967 Summer Universiade